Warren Sorby (born 28 August 1965) is a native of Fiji and an Olympic swimmer. He competed in the 1984 Olympics in Los Angeles, California in the men's 100 meter freestyle, men's 100 meter backstroke, men's 100 meter butterfly, and men's 200 meter individual medley. He then went on to compete in the 1988 Olympics in Seoul, South Korea in the men's 50 meter freestyle and men's 100 meter freestyle.

References

External links

1965 births
Living people
Fijian male swimmers
Commonwealth Games competitors for Fiji
Swimmers at the 1982 Commonwealth Games
Olympic swimmers of Fiji
Swimmers at the 1984 Summer Olympics
Swimmers at the 1988 Summer Olympics
Fijian people of British descent